Prince Mikhail Petrovich Dolgorukov (Russian: Князь Михаил Петрович Долгоруков; 1780—1808) was a Russian prince and general who died at the Battle of Virta Bridge against the Swedes on 27 October 1808.

Biography

The son of General Prince Peter Petrovich Dolgorukov, Mikhail Petrovich was born into the Rurikid family of Dolgorukov. In 1796, he fought in the Russian-Persian War on the Caspian Sea. After being promoted to major in 1798, he joined the Chevalier Corps and then the Life Guard Regiment in 1799 where he became a colonel in 1800.

In the early 1800s, he travelled around Europe for four years before returning to Russia in 1805. After successful action at Pultusk, Mohrungen, Passenheim, Wolfsdorf and Eylau, he was promoted to major general in 1807. In 1808, he led the Russian troops against the Swedes during the Russian advance to Gamlakarleby, attacking the Swedes near Himango on 27 October 1808 where he was killed by a cannonball at the Battle of Virta Bridge. Shortly before his death in 1808, Prince Dologukov challenged Gen. Nikolay Tuchkov to a duel. It happened amidst the Finnish War, so Tuchkov proposed that instead of a conventional duel, they make a joint appearance on the frontline, so that injuries might be blamed on an enemy bullet. So was their decision, and Dolgorukov was soon killed by a cannonball launched from Swedish lines.

References

1780 births
1808 deaths
Russian princes
Imperial Russian Army generals
Russian commanders of the Napoleonic Wars
People of the Russo-Persian Wars
Russian military personnel of the Finnish War
Burials at the Annunciation Church of the Alexander Nevsky Lavra